The following is an overview of 2014 in manga. It includes winners of notable awards, best-sellers, title debuts and endings, deaths of notable manga-related people as well as any other relevant manga-related events. For an overview of the year in comics from other countries, see 2014 in comics.

Awards
38th Kodansha Manga Awards
Best Children's Manga: Yo-Kai Watch by Noriyuki Konishi
Best Shōnen Manga: Baby Steps by Hikaru Katsuki
Best Shōjo Manga: Taiyō no Ie by Ta'amo
Best General Manga: Shōwa Genroku Rakugo Shinjū by Haruko Kumota
7th Manga Taishō: A Bride's Story by Kaoru Mori
45th Seiun Awards
Best Comic: The World of Narue by Tomohiro Marukawa
59th Shogakukan Manga Awards
Best Children's Manga: Zekkyō Gakkyū by Emi Ishikawa
Best Shōnen Manga: Magi: The Labyrinth of Magic by Shinobu Ohtaka
Best Shōjo Manga: Kanojo wa Uso o Aishisugiteru by Kotomi Aoki
Best General Manga: Mogura no Uta by Noboru Takahashi
Judging Committee Special Award: Asari-chan by Mayumi Muroyama
18th Tezuka Osamu Cultural Prize
Grand Prize: March Comes in Like a Lion by Chica Umino
New Creator Prize: Machiko Kyō for Mitsuami no Kami-sama and other works
Short Work Prize: Yūki Shikawa for Onnoji and other works
Special Prize: Fujiko Fujio (A) for Manga Michi and Ai... Shirisomeshi Kei ni
Reader Prize: Space Brothers by Chūya Koyama

Best-sellers

Titles
The following is a list of the 10 best-selling manga titles in Japan during 2014 according to Oricon.

Volumes
The following is a list of the 10 best-selling manga volumes in Japan during 2014 according to Oricon. It was the largest segment of the book market by number of copies sold and the second-largest by value.

Title debuts
January 9 - All You Need Is Kill, written by Ryōsuke Takeuchi and illustrated by Takeshi Obata
January 9 - Gakuen Chaika!
January 27 - Buddy Complex, illustrated by Hiroki Ohara
January 27 - Buddy Complex: Coupling of Battlefield, illustrated by Sakae Saito
January 28 - Alice in Murderland by Kaori Yuki
January 28 - Inuyashiki by Hiroya Oku
January - Etotama, written by Takashi Hoshi and Tōru Zekū and illustrated by Hiroma Hino
February 12 - Fūka by Kōji Seo
February 15 - Dungeon Meshi by 
February 25 - Himegoto by Norio Tsukudani
March 14 - Jinsei, written by Jinsei: Manga no Shō and illustrated by Seiji Matsuyama
March 20 - Baki-Dou by Keisuke Itagaki
March 20 - Himouto! Umaru-chan by Sankaku Head
March 24 - Tokyo Tarareba Musume by Akiko Higashimura
March 28 - Bakumatsu Rock -howling soul- by Shinshu Ueda
March - Amagi Brilliant Park, written by Shoji Gatoh and illustrated by Kimitake Yoshioka
March - HappinessCharge PreCure!, written by Izumi Todo and illustrated by Futago Kamikita
April - Chivalry of a Failed Knight, written by Riku Misora and illustrated by Megumi Soramichi
April 4 - Hōzuki-san Chi no Aneki (+Imouto) by Ran Igarashi
April 9 - Gangsta.:Cursed. EP_Marco Adriano, written by Kohske and illustrated by Syuhei Kamo
April 14 - GTO: Paradise Lost by Tohru Fujisawa
May 22 - Complex Age by Yui Sakuma
May 22 - Is It Wrong to Try to Pick Up Girls in a Dungeon?: Sword Oratoria, written by Fujino Ōmori and illustrated by Kiyotaka Haimura
May 26 - Hinomaru Zumō by Kawada
May 27 - Alderamin on the Sky, illustrated by Taiki Kawakami
May - The Fruit of Grisaia: L'Oiseau bleu, written by Jun'ichi Fujisaku and illustrated by Taka Himeno
May - Yokokuhan: The Copycat, written by Tetsuya Tsutsui and illustrated by Fumio Obata
June - Amagi Brilliant Park? Fumo, written by Shoji Gatoh and illustrated by Kōji Azuma
June - Dagashi Kashi by Kotoyama
June 9 - To the Abandoned Sacred Beasts by Maybe
June 20 -Himegoto by Norio Tsukudani
July 1 - Ao Oni: Anthology, written by Kenji Kuroda and illustrated by Karin Suzuragi
July 3 - Hina's Lip, written by Kazemichi and illustrated by Mayumi Katō
July 7 - My Hero Academia by Kōhei Horikoshi
July 17 - Fairy Tail Zero by Hiro Mashima
July 26 - Girl Friend (Kari): Shiina Kokomi-hen ~Koishite Madonna~, illustrated by Tsukako Akina
July - Chain Chronicle Crimson by Junpei Okazaki
August 2 - Fairy Tail: Blue Mistral by Rui Watanabe
August 3 - Cross Ange by Kenjirō Takeshita
August 11 - Aldnoah.Zero Season One, written by Olympus Knights and illustrated by Pinakes
August 14 - Dungeon ni Deai o Motomeru no wa Machigatteiru Darō ka 4-koma: Kamisama no Nichijō by Masaya Takamura
August 18 - Higanjima 48 Nichigo... by Kōji Matsumoto
August 22 - Girl Friend (Kari): Murakami Fumio-hen ~Secret Smile~, illustrated by Takahiro Seguchi 
August 22 - Girl Friend (Kari): Chloe Lemarie-hen ~Chole to Nihon to Mirai no Tobira~, illustrated by Sawayoshi Azuma 
August 22 - Girl Friend (Kari): Sakurai Akane-hen ~Kokoro o Komete, Yūki no On Air!~, illustrated by Kakao
August 22 - Girl Friend (Kari) ~Seiō Gakuen Girl's Diary~, illustrated by Na!
August 26 - Code Geass: Oz the Reflection O2, written by Toujou Chika and Shigeru Morita and illustrated by Toujou Chika
August 27 - Celestial Method, written by Naoki Hisaya and illustrated by Yuka Namisaki
September 5 - Girls und Panzer, written by Takaaki Suzuki and illustrated by Takeshi Nogami
September 22 - Hetalia World Stars by Hidekaz Himaruya
September 28 - Battle Rabbits by Yuki Amemiya and Yukino Ichihara
October 5 - Cross Ange: Tenshi to Ryū no Ecole by Osaji
October 16 - Salty Road, written by Ark Performance and illustrated by TALI
October 16 - Cute High Earth Defense Club Love! by Umatani Kurari
October 27 - Absolute Duo Tea Party, written by Takumi Hiiragiboshi and illustrated by Tōru Oiwaka
October 28 - Gunnm: Mars Chronicle by Yukito Kishiro
October - Gundam Reconguista in G by Tamon Ōta
November 19 - Girls und Panzer: Gekitou! Maginot-sen Desu!! by Ryūichi Saitaniya
November 26 - Ai Tenchi Muyo!, written by Masaki Kajishima and illustrated by Haruna Nakazato
December 12 - Aldnoah.Zero Gaiden: Twin Gemini, written by Kiyokazu Satake
December - In Search of the Lost Future, written by Trumple and Atelier High Key and illustrated by Takeshi Kagura
December - Masuda Kōsuke Gekijō Gag Manga Biyori GB by Kōsuke Masuda
Ange Vierge Linkage, written by Mako Komao and illustrated by Sakaki Yoshioka
Gakusei Shima Kōsaku
Princess Maison, written and illustrated by Aoi Ikebe

Title endings
March 5 - Girls und Panzer by Ryūichi Saitaniya
April 9 - Again! by 
May 29 - All You Need Is Kill, written by Ryōsuke Takeuchi and illustrated by Takeshi Obata
May  - A-bout!! - Asagiri Daikatsuyaku Hen by Ichikawa Masa
June 28 - No Regrets, written by Gun Snark and illustrated by Hikaru Suruga
July 26 - Code Geass: Oz the Reflection, written by Toujou Chika and Shigeru Morita and illustrated by Toujou Chika
August 27 - Buddy Complex: Coupling of Battlefield, illustrated by Sakae Saito
September 5 - Higanjima: Saigo no 47 Nichikan by Kōji Matsumoto
September 27 - Abyss of Hyperspace, written by Tatsuo Sato and illustrated by Chibimaru
September - The Comic Artist and His Assistants 2 by Hiroyuki
October 27 - Buddy Complex, illustrated by Hiroki Ohara
October - Battle Spirits: Saikyou Ginga Ultimate Zero, written by Hajime Yatate and illustrated by Masato Ichishiki
November 10 - Naruto by Masashi Kishimoto
November - 37.5°C no Namida by 
November - Gag Manga Biyori by Kōsuke Masuda
December 11 - Gakuen Chaika!
December 31 - Sungeki no Kyojin by

Deaths
, manga artist

See also
2014 in anime

References

Manga
Manga